TexAgs is an independent Texas A&M University fan website. It features articles, chat, forums, and recruiting information about Texas A&M Aggie sports. During the 2012 college football season, the website received an average of 500,000 monthly unique visitors.

TexAgs was created by Peter Kuo in May 1997 and sold to its current operators in December 1999. When it debuted, TexAgs only had 2,000-3,000 members, and forums only discussed Aggie football. In February 2007, The Association of Former Students announced a marketing partnership with TexAgs.com. As of 2007, there were more than 60,000 accounts. The website never used any form of advertising for promotion, as it grew popular via word of mouth. As of 2013, there were over 9,500 paying subscribers, and the website presently includes over 50 different forums.

Notable forum posts include one that disclosed that former University of Oklahoma quarterback Rhett Bomar received payment for non-worked hours from a local auto dealership seven months before the University kicked the player off of the team and reported the infraction to the NCAA. Former University President and former U.S. Secretary of Defense Robert Gates has posted as "Ranger65".  In April 2010, TexAgs gained national attention when a forum member posting as "dermdoc" posted of terminating an employee because of increased costs due to Obamacare.  The employee happened to have voted for President Barack Obama. Texas A&M graduate and US Astronaut Mike Fossum posted late on July 29, 2011 from the International Space Station using an account TexAgs staff set up for him earlier that day.

In 2009, the website became an affiliate of ESPN.com as part of the 20 college TEAM Sports Network, but that relationship has since ended.

On August 22, 2011, TexAgs radio was launched as a daily Aggie sports talk show on KZNE 1150 The Zone. The show airs for three hours on weekdays and includes a one-hour TV show simulcast. Hosts include David Nuño, Billy Liucci, and Olin Buchanan.

As of 2019, TexAgs had four owners, nineteen full-time employees, fourteen part-time employees, and seven interns.

See also
List of Internet forums

References

External links
TexAgs official website

Texas A&M Aggies
Texas A&M University
Sport Internet forums
American sport websites
Internet properties established in 1998